Makati Hope Christian School (Abbreviation: MHCS; simplified Chinese 马加智嘉南学校; traditional Chinese: 馬加智嘉南學校; pinyin: Majiā zhì Jiā Nán xué xiào; Hokkien: Makāti ka lám Hào) is a Filipino-Chinese school in Makati founded in 1985.  Its students have consistently performed well in government-administered examinations such as the National Achievement Test (NAT).  In school year 2012-2013, its High 4 students ranked first in the NAT among private schools in Makati.

History 
MHCS started operation with just a handful of kindergarten pupils and school personnel in 1985.  To date, the student population has steadily increased along with school personnel.  
In 1986, the Early Childhood Department (formerly known as the Preschool Department) was granted recognition by DECS permit No. P-0066 series 1986.  In 1989, the Elementary Department was granted recognition permit No. E-0001 series 1989.  In 1993, government recognition was granted to the High School Department by virtue of DECS permit No. S-103 series 1993.  The school has graduated 20 batches of high school students since that time.

School Logo 
The circular shape of the logo signifies the holistic and multifaceted education espoused by the school.  The orange flame signifies the school’s fervor to promote lifelong learning in the school community and to foster a passionate commitment to do God’s work in God’s world, represented by the blue globe.  The red cross symbolizes the redemptive work of Jesus Christ.

Academics 
The MHCS curriculum incorporates a three-fold blend of classroom instruction, mentoring intervention, and experiential learning.

The Early Childhood program – which offers Pre-Nursery, Nursery, Kinder and Grade 1 – adopts a developmentally appropriate and progressive approach that aims to provide effective and fun training for young children. This prepares them for the demands of the curriculum for the elementary level.

The elementary and high school program, meanwhile, aims to develop competencies that will equip the students to meet the demands of the changing times and to prepare them for greater challenges in college. The program includes Scholastic (English language learning software), Practical Music Course, computer and accounting subjects, alongside the expanded Math and Science program.

Makati Hope offers intensive Chinese language instruction from Early Childhood to High School. Christian Education is also integrated in all subject areas, as well as chapel services and other enrichment activities, to instill Christian values and principles.

Through the Information and Technology program, students learn about Visual Basic and C programming, web design, application, desktop publishing, and media software.

Clubs 
Students may choose from various co-curricular and extra-curricular organizations such as the Student Council (SC), varsity teams, Young Christian Scientists’ Society (YCSS), Candle Pen, Kapisanan ng mga Mag-aaral ng Filipino (KaMFil), Library Enthusiasts’ Club (LEC), Art Club, Anvil of Christian Talents (ACTs), Robotics Club, and more.

References

Chinese-language schools in Metro Manila
Schools in Makati
Christian schools in the Philippines